An open secret is a concept or idea that is "officially" (de jure) secret or restricted in knowledge, but in practice (de facto) is widely known; or it refers to something that is widely known to be true but which none of the people most intimately concerned are willing to categorically acknowledge in public.

Popular examples

Government and military

One famous "open secret" is that of Area 51, a United States military base containing an aircraft testing facility. The U.S. government did not explicitly affirm the existence of any military facility near Groom Lake, Lincoln County, Nevada, until 2013, when the CIA released documents revealing that the site was established to test spy planes. While the general location of the base is now officially acknowledged, the base does not appear on government maps or in declassified satellite photography. Yet despite this, the base was demonstrably and widely acknowledged to exist for many years before the CIA officially confirmed its existence. The immense secrecy has made it the frequent subject of conspiracy theories and a central component to UFO folklore.

Likewise, Delta Force can be considered an open secret, since its existence has been denied in the past by the United States government.

The National Security Agency was formally established by President Truman in a memorandum of 24 October 1952, that revised National Security Council Intelligence Directive (NSCID) 9. Since President Truman's memo was a classified document, the existence of the NSA was not known to the public at that time. Due to its ultra-secrecy the U.S. intelligence community referred to the NSA as "No Such Agency".

Following World War II the United States government provided immunity for members of the covert Japanese human experimentation program, Unit 731, in exchange for the data that was researched during the Japanese occupation of Manchuria. The Soviets likely provided leniency towards Unit 731 members in the Khabarovsk war crimes trials due to the sentencing of members for seven years before they were repatriated to Japan. 

Camp Mirage is the codename for a former Canadian Forces forward logistics facility located in Dubai, United Arab Emirates. The facility was established in late December 2001 and, though not officially acknowledged by the Canadian Forces, was considered an open secret.

The existence of the British Secret Intelligence Service (MI6) was widely known for several decades before the government's official acknowledgement of the organisation in 1994. Its Australian counterpart, ASIS, was the subject of a newspaper exposé years before its existence was officially acknowledged.

Israel is widely acknowledged to possess nuclear weapons. This can be considered an open secret, because the Israeli government has never explicitly stated whether or not it possesses a nuclear stockpile, officially maintaining a policy of deliberate ambiguity.

Post Office Tower was completed in 1964 and information about it was designated an official secret, due to its importance to the national communications network. In 1978, the journalist Duncan Campbell was tried for collecting information about secret locations, and during the trial the judge ordered that the sites could not be identified by name; the Post Office Tower could only be referred to as 'Location 23'.

However, this is incorrect; the 1:25,000 (published 1971) and 1:10,000 (published 1981) Ordnance Survey maps show the tower. It is also shown in the London A–Z street atlas from 1984.

Entertainment
Kayfabe, or the presentation of professional wrestling as "real" or unscripted, is an open secret, kept displayed as legitimate within the confines of wrestling programs but openly acknowledged as predetermined by wrestlers and promoters in the context of interviews for decades.

In television, the primary real-world identity of The Stig, a costumed and masked television test-driver used by BBC Television for Top Gear, was an open secret until the unofficial embargo was broken by a newspaper in 2009.

See also 
He never married
Pronoun game
Secret de Polichinelle

References

Secrecy
LGBT linguistics